The final round of the 2018 FIBA Women's Basketball World Cup took place from 26 to 30 September 2018.

Qualified teams
The group winners qualified for the quarterfinals while the runners-up and third placed teams advanced to the qualification round.

Bracket
5–8th place

Qualification round

China vs Japan

Nigeria vs Greece

France vs Turkey

Spain vs Senegal

Quarterfinals

United States vs Nigeria

Australia vs China

Belgium vs France

Canada vs Spain

5–8th place semifinals

France vs Nigeria

Canada vs China

Semifinals

Belgium vs United States

Spain vs Australia

Seventh place game

Fifth place game

Third place game

Final

References

2018 FIBA Women's Basketball World Cup